Jack Geddes (4 February 1868 – 3 August 1949) was  a former Australian rules footballer who played with Collingwood in the Victorian Football League (VFL).

Notes

External links 

Jack Geddes's profile at Collingwood Forever

1868 births
1949 deaths
Australian rules footballers from Western Australia
Carlton Football Club (VFA) players
Collingwood Football Club players
Rovers Football Club players